Caligo telamonius is a brush-footed butterfly (family Nymphalidae). The species was first described by Cajetan von Felder and Rudolf Felder in 1862. It is found in southern North America, Central America, and South America.

Subspecies
Two subspecies belong to the species Caligo telamonius:
 Caligo telamonius memnon
 Caligo telamonius menus

References

Further reading

External links
 

Caligo
Butterflies described in 1862